Gediminas Hill Lift — an inclined lift in Vilnius, Lithuania. Opened in 2003, it is used by visitors to reach the Vilnius Upper Castle and Gediminas Tower.

Description
The lift was built by ABS Transportbahnen (Doppelmayr Garaventa Group). The system is operated by Vilniaus pilių direkcija.  

The main characteristics:
 Length:  
 Difference in level: 39 m
 Inclination: 37°
 Track gauge: 1.200 mm
 Travel speed: 2 m/s
 Cabin capacity: 16 passengers

The lift is powered by electricity. The time of ride is 1 minute.

References 

Rail transport in Vilnius
Tourist attractions in Vilnius
Inclined elevators
1200 mm gauge railways
2003 establishments in Lithuania